Kamil Chanas (born April 20, 1985) is a Polish professional basketball player who plays for Stal Ostrów Wielkopolski of the Polish League.

References

1985 births
Living people
Basket Zielona Góra players
Polish men's basketball players
Śląsk Wrocław basketball players
Sportspeople from Wrocław
Stal Ostrów Wielkopolski players
Turów Zgorzelec players
Shooting guards